The Men's 10,000 metres at the 2014 Commonwealth Games, as part of the athletics programme, was held at Hampden Park on 1 August 2014.

Results

References

Men's 10,000 metres
2014